Phyllobacterium trifolii is a root-nodulating bacteria that was first isolated from nodules in Trifolium and Lupinus species. Its type strain is PETP02T (=LMG 22712T =CECT 7015T).

References

Further reading

Pongslip, Neelawan. Phenotypic and Genotypic Diversity of Rhizobia. Bentham Science Publishers, 2012.

External links
LPSN

Type strain of Phyllobacterium trifolii at BacDive -  the Bacterial Diversity Metadatabase

Phyllobacteriaceae
Bacteria described in 2005